Melvin Live is the first live album by Juno Award winning Canadian singer-songwriter Melanie Doane. It was recorded at the Horseshoe Tavern in Toronto in January 2001.

Track listing
"Goliath"
"My Sister Sings"
"How You Cried"
"She's Like the Swallow"
"Waiting For The Tide"
"Melanie Doane Song"
"Sweet Sorrow"
"Never Doubt I Love"
"Happy Homemaker"
"Adam's Rib"
"Tamarack"
"Znefu For Y'all"
"Tell You Stories"
"Oowatanite"
"Bionic (studio recording)"

References

Melanie Doane albums
2001 live albums
Albums recorded at the Horseshoe Tavern